See also 1697 in piracy, 1699 in piracy, and Timeline of piracy.

Events
December 8 - William III of England issues his 1698 Act of Grace.

Indian Ocean 
January 30 - Captain William Kidd plunders the Quedagh Merchant, an Armenian merchant vessel sailing under French passes, near the Malabar Coast.
April - Kidd encounters Robert Culliford's pirate vessel Mocha Frigate at Île Sainte-Marie.  Most of Kidd's crew desert to Culliford.  Kidd burns the Adventure Galley and takes his remaining crew aboard the Adventure Prize (ex-Quedagh Merchant).
September - Culliford and Dirk Chivers plunder the Great Muhammed.

North America 

 Undated - Canoot attacks and steals John Redwood's ship then raids the town of Lewes the next day.
 Undated - William Cotter and his former shipmate John Blackmore are convicted of piracy but receive no punishment.

South America 

 Undated - Anne Dieu-le-Veut is released from Colombia after being captured by Spain.

Births

 Charles Harris

Deaths

 Robert Colley
 Richard Glover
 Robert Glover

References

Piracy
Piracy by year